Two ships of the Royal Navy have borne the name HMS Manxman, after the term for an inhabitant of the Isle of Man:

  was a ferry launched in 1903 and requisitioned by the Royal Navy in 1915 for conversion to a sea plane carrier.  Returned to civilian service in 1920, the ship was requisitioned as a radar training vessel, HMS Caduceus, during World War II and scrapped in 1945.
 was an  launched in 1940, converted to a minesweeper support ship in 1963, and sold for breaking up in 1972.

References

Royal Navy ship names